The southern blue devil (Paraplesiops meleagris) is a species of fish in the longfin family Plesiopidae endemic to southern Australia.  It is a close relative of the eastern blue devil (Paraplesiops bleekeri), which lives in the coastal waters of eastern Australia, and of the western blue devil (P. sinclairi), of southwestern Western Australia with which it is sometimes considered conspecific.

Description
The fish grows to about 350 mm in length.  It is generally deep blue, bluish, or blue-brown in colour with a scattering of brighter blue spots, with a long dorsal and large anal and pelvic fins.

Distribution and habitat
These fish are found along the southern Australian coastline, from South Australia to eastern Victoria.  They occupy reefs, ledges, crevices, and deep cave systems, at depths ranging from 3 to over 40 m, sometimes in small groups containing individuals of sizes varying from small juveniles to mature adults.

Behaviour

Breeding
Eggs are laid on a substrate and are guarded by the male until they hatch.

Feeding
They feed on fish and crustaceans.

References

External links
 Fishes of Australia : Paraplesiops meleagris

southern blue devil
Marine fish of Southern Australia
southern blue devil
southern blue devil